Morben is a hamlet in northern Powys, Wales. Part of the historic county of Montgomeryshire (Sir Drefaldwyn) from 1536 to 1974, it lies on the Afon Dyfi and was once the home of a number of riverside quays, including Cei Ward and Y Bwtri. The site of Cei Ward lies alongside the A487 opposite Plas Llugwy, where the road, railway and river run close together. Y Bwtri lay on the bend of the river opposite Pennal and was the site of a shipyard.

The narrow gauge Corris, Machynlleth & River Dovey Tramroad (opened 1859) carried slate from the quarries around Corris and Aberllefenni to Morben, where it was loaded into ships for onward shipment. At around the time the tramway became the Corris Railway in the early 1860s the Aberystwith and Welsh Coast Railway extended the standard gauge rails west of Machynlleth, and soon after the section of the Tramroad west of Machynlleth was abandoned and slate was instead trans-shipped to main line trains.

Inward goods offloaded at Morben would have included lime and coal.

Morben lies on the A487 trunk road from Machynlleth to Aberystwyth. Plas Morben stands on the hillside above the road, while Morben Isaf caravan park lies between the road and the river.

Villages in Powys
Corris Railway